Pärnu City Orchestra is an orchestra which acts in Pärnu, Estonia.

The orchestra was established in 1994.

The orchestra's chief conductors have been: Loit Lepalaan, Jüri Alperten (1998–2017) and Kaspar Mänd (since 2019).

In 2012 the orchestra produced its first CD "6 Seasons+".

References

External links
 

Pärnu
Estonian musical groups
Estonian orchestras